Ponte Vedra Beach is a wealthy unincorporated seaside community and suburb of Jacksonville, Florida in St. Johns County, Florida, United States.

The area is known for its resorts, including the Ponte Vedra Inn and Club, the Lodge and Club, and the Marriott at Sawgrass. It lies within St. Johns County, which is the wealthiest county in Florida. Ponte Vedra Beach is an upper-income tourist resort area best known for its association with golf and is home to the PGA Tour and the Players Championship, hosted at TPC Sawgrass.

History 
What is now north Florida was visited several times by European explorers in the 16th century, but there is little evidence for them specifically coming to Ponte Vedra Beach. It may have been sighted by Juan Ponce de León during his voyage to Florida in 1513, but as his precise landfall is unknown, this claim can be made by many communities on the east coast of Florida.

The area remained sparsely populated through the late 19th century, even as other seaside communities began to develop to the north. Minerals were discovered in 1914, and a community known as Mineral City grew around the mining operations. These minerals, mostly titanium (ilmenite), zircon, and rutile were recovered from beach sands by the Buckman and Pritchard Mining Company. The National Lead Company bought Buckman and Pritchard in 1921 and discontinued mining as demand dropped after World War I. In 1929 it began to develop the area to be similar to The Cloister in Sea Island, Georgia. Colonel Joseph C. Stehlin, who had been with the company in St. Louis, arrived on January 1, 1929 to manage development.

The company wanted a more impressive name than Mineral City for its resort, so Colonel Stehlin and his wife, Elizabeth (née Morton), went to the library in St. Augustine to research various possibilities for a new name. Since Florida had been under Spanish rule, they looked on an old map and found the name Pontevedra on the Atlantic coast of Spain at "approximately" the same latitude as Mineral City. (Pontevedra, Spain, however, is over 800 miles farther north at about the same latitude as Boston.) The Galician name of the town was derived from a Roman bridge ("pontis vetera" or "old bridge") that spanned the nearby Lérez River centuries earlier. Colonel Stehlin submitted the name to the National Lead board for approval and Mineral City became Ponte Vedra.

Ponte Vedra Club

In the early 1920s, the National Lead Company built a nine-hole golf course designed by Herbert Bertram Strong, one of the founders of the PGA, plus a 12-room clubhouse constructed of logs for the use of its employees.  After the company left the area, that real estate became the foundation of the Ponte Vedra Club.
Stockton, Whatley, Davin & Co., a local developer, became the owner of the Ponte Vedra Corporation in July 1934.

World War II 

During World War II the German submarine U-584 debarked four saboteurs at Ponte Vedra as part of the failed Operation Pastorius. The four German spies, all of whom had previously lived in the United States, came ashore on the night of June 16, 1942 carrying explosives and American money. After landing they strolled up the beach to Jacksonville Beach, where they caught a city bus to Jacksonville and departed by train for Cincinnati and Chicago. The invaders were captured before they could do any damage. They were tried by a military tribunal and executed.

Tournament Players Club at Sawgrass

In 1972, real estate developers broke ground on the  Sawgrass development. In the mid 1970s, Deane Beman, the Commissioner of the PGA golf tour, was looking for a permanent home for the Tournament Players Championship. Many places in northern Florida were being considered. In an attempt to bring positive attention to the area, developer Paul Fletcher offered a  tract of land to Beman for $1.

Beman could not refuse this one dollar deal for the future home of The Players Championship and the headquarters of the PGA Tour. The Sawgrass Stadium Course has been the permanent home of The Players Championship since 1982.

Geographics 
Ponte Vedra Beach is wholly located east of the Intracoastal Waterway, south of the Duval County line, and north of Vilano Beach.  The South Ponte Vedra Beach community is commonly considered to be a part of Ponte Vedra Beach. The Ponte Vedra area includes Ponte Vedra, Ponte Vedra Beach, South Ponte Vedra Beach (an area between the Atlantic and Guana Tolomato Matanzas National Estuarine Research Reserve), Sawgrass, and Palm Valley. In June 2006, the U.S. Postal Service designated an area to the south and southwest of the 32082 area as Ponte Vedra (as distinct from Ponte Vedra Beach) and assigned it the ZIP code 32081.

Demographics 
Median household income in Ponte Vedra Beach is $102,918 and median family income is $109,181. The median age is 49.0. The Ponte Vedra area is known for being a very affluent area of North Florida, and boasts one of the best school districts in Florida. Ponte Vedra Beach was 50th on the list of 100 finalists for CNN and Money Magazine's 2005 List of the Best Places to Live. It was the first place in Florida to be named in that year and one of only four areas in the state to make the cut. As of August 1, 2012 the average house costs around $720,000.

City statistics

 Population: 27,750
 Median family income (per year): $116,399	
 Unemployment (September 2015): 3.8%	
 Job growth % (2000–2008): 5.27%	
 Median home price: $330,000
 Restaurants (within 15 miles): 1,373	
 Avg. High temp in July °F: 89.90 °F	
 Avg. Low temp in Jan °F: 46.60 °F
 Median age: 48.00

Education

Public primary and secondary schools in Ponte Vedra Beach are administered by the St. Johns County School District. Allen D. Nease High School and Ponte Vedra High School, which was constructed to relieve the overcrowding of Allen D. Nease High School, serve as the two public high schools in the Ponte Vedra area. Alice B. Landrum Middle School is one of the primary, public middle schools in the area. There is also a K-8 school in the area called Valley Ridge Academy. The Ponte Vedra Palm Valley-Rawlings Elementary School serves as one of the primary, public elementary schools (K-5) in the area, as well as Ocean Palms Elementary School.

Ponte Vedra offers private education (K-8) at the Palmer Catholic Academy. Also, the Bolles School has one of their two lower school campuses in Ponte Vedra Beach, and offers education from pre-kindergarten to fifth grade before transferring students to the middle and high schools located in Jacksonville, Florida.

Additionally, the St Johns County Public Library System has a Ponte Vedra Beach branch library.

Notable people
Famous past and present residents of Ponte Vedra:
 Kim Alexis, actress and model
 Ehsan Bayat, Afghan American businessman
 Jason Altmire, U.S. Congressman
 Tony Boselli, professional football player
 Caitlin Brunell, Miss America's Outstanding Teen 2008 (daughter of Mark Brunell)
 Mark Brunell, professional football player and coach
 Shelby Cannon, professional tennis player
 Christina Crawford, dancer and professional wrestler
 Ron DeSantis, 46th Governor of Florida and former U.S. Congressman for 6th district
 Ron Duguay, professional hockey player and coach
 Bob Duval, professional golfer and author
 David Duval, professional golfer
 Tim Finchem, PGA Tour Commissioner
  Todd Fordham professional football player
 Alicia Fox, model, WWE wrestler, actress
 Fred Funk, professional golfer
 Jim Furyk, professional golfer
 Dan Galorath, software developer, businessman and author
 Brian Gottfried, professional tennis player
 Michael Huyghue, United Football League Commissioner
 Dan Jenkins, author and sports writer
 Hamilton Jordan, White House Chief of Staff for President Carter
 Jeff Klauk, professional golfer
 E. L. Konigsburg, author
 Billy Kratzert, professional golfer and commentator
 Matt Kuchar, professional golfer
 Bowie Kuhn, lawyer and former MLB Commissioner
 Christian Laettner, professional basketball player
 Mike Lester, cartoonist, illustrator, author
 Frank Lickliter, professional golfer
 Todd Martin, professional tennis player
 Len Mattiace, professional golfer
 Brian Moorman, former professional football player
 Mark McCumber, professional golfer
 Craig McKinley, first National Guard four-star general
 Ben Nowland, professional football player
 Donna Orender, professional athlete and sports executive
 Calvin Peete, professional golfer
 Rick Rhoden, professional athlete
 Fred Rogers, television personality, Mr. Rogers' Neighborhood
 Theodore Roosevelt, Jr., general and recipient of the Medal of Honor
 Michael Russell, professional tennis player
 Vijay Singh, professional golfer
 Nancy Soderberg, foreign policy strategist
 Tim Tebow, professional football & baseball player
 Bill Terry, baseball Hall of Fame member
 G. Kennedy Thompson, former Wachovia CEO
 Bobby Thomson, professional baseball player, star of the "Shot Heard 'Round the World"
 MaliVai Washington, professional tennis player
 Bobby Weed, golf course designer
 Bob Wenzel, college basketball coach and broadcaster
 Rick Wilkins, professional baseball player
 Betty Williams, Nobel Peace Prize recipient

See also

 Jacksonville Beaches
 St. Johns County, Florida
 Greater Jacksonville
 National Register of Historic Places listings in St. Johns County, Florida

References

External links

 
 
  U.S. Army Corps of Engineers, Jacksonville District. St. Johns County, Florida, South Ponte Vedra Beach, Vilano Beach, and Summer Haven Reaches. Coastal Storm Risk Management Project Final Integrated Feasibility Study and Environmental Assessment. March 2017.

Unincorporated communities in St. Johns County, Florida
Seaside resorts in Florida
Beaches of St. Johns County, Florida
Unincorporated communities in the Jacksonville metropolitan area
Unincorporated communities in Florida
Populated coastal places in Florida on the Atlantic Ocean
Beaches of Florida